Stratovox, known in Japan as Speak & Rescue (スピーク&レスキュー), is a 1980 arcade fixed shooter developed and published in Japan by Sun Electronics and released in North America by Taito. It is the first video game with voice synthesis. The player must shoot UFOs attempting to kidnap astronauts that appear on the right side of the screen. If all astronauts are kidnapped, the game is over.

Among the voices the player hears are the phrases "Help me, help me", "Very good!", "We'll be back" and "Lucky". The phrase "Help me" is played during attract mode. The Japanese version of the game features Japanese speech, such as 「助けて！」 ( "Tasukete!") instead of "Help Me!"

Legacy
Bandits from Sirius Software for the Apple II (1982) is a Stratovox clone that even has the same screen layout, with the moon on the right side of the screen containing the items to protect. In Bandits these items are fruits instead of astronauts. Spider Fighter (1982) for the Atari 2600 also has the player protecting fruit, and Digital Press described it as "much like the coin-op game Stratovox but w/o the voice."

World record
According to Twin Galaxies, John Brissie, of Milwaukee, Wisconsin, USA, scored a world record 140,900 points on Stratovox on April 16, 2008.

See also
Berzerk (1980), another arcade video game with speech synthesis

References

External links

1980 video games
Arcade video games
Arcade-only video games
Fixed shooters
Video games developed in Japan